Z.Vex Effects is an effects pedal company based in Minneapolis, Minnesota. Their name derives from the name of founder Zachary Vex.

Products

The company's most famous product is the Fuzz Factory. All of their pedals (except the budget-line Vexter series) are hand painted at their factory in Minnesota. All Vexter subassemblies are made in Taiwan, but the final assembly is completed in the United States.

 Fuzz Factory (fuzzbox)
 Box of Rock (preamp-booster/overdrive)
 Box of Metal (high gain distortion)
 Woolly Mammoth (bass/guitar fuzzbox)
 Super Hard-On (preamp-booster/overdrive)
 Super Duper 2-in-1 (preamp/overdrive)
 Machine (fuzzbox)
 Ooh Wah II (step-sequenced filter)
 Ringtone (step-sequenced ring modulator)
 Lo-Fi Loop Junky (analog looper)
 Instant Lo-Fi Junky
 Seek Wah II (step-sequenced filter)
 Octane III (octave-generating fuzzbox)
 Seek Trem (step-sequenced tremolo)
 Tremorama (step-sequenced tremolo)

 Jonny Octave (octave)
 Wah Probe
 Fuzz Probe
 Trem Probe
 The Nano Head (tube amplifier)
 The iMPAMP
 Distortron
 Mastotron
 Basstortion (bass distortion)
 Sonar (square-wave tremolo w/ Machine circuit)
 Double Rock! (dual cascading Box of Rock circuits w/ sub control and Super Hard On conversion, originally designed for J. Mascis of Dinosaur Jr.)
 Loop Gate (high-headroom noise gate w/ adjustable release time, chop mode and wide-range sensitivity control)
 Drip Guitar (discontinued)
 Volume Probe (discontinued)

Notable users

 Greg Camp former guitarist and writer for Smash Mouth, currently of Defektor
 Malcolm Young of AC/DC had used the Nano Head mostly at home
 Trent Reznor of Nine Inch Nails owns a Fuzz Factory, a Machine, a Woolly Mammoth and a Nano Head
 Alan Sparhawk of Low
 Matthew Bellamy of Muse, owns guitars with a built-in Fuzz Factory
 Stephen Carpenter of Deftones
 J Mascis of Dinosaur Jr.
 Billy Gibbons of ZZ Top
 Isaac Brock (musician) of Modest Mouse
 Brad Shultz of Cage The Elephant uses a Z.Vex Mastotron
 John Frusciante, previously of Red Hot Chili Peppers owns a Z.Vex Fuzz Factory
 Eric Erlandson of Hole
 Billy Corgan of Smashing Pumpkins owns several Z.Vex pedals
 Jack White of The White Stripes
 Dean Fertita of The Dead Weather
 Nels Cline of Wilco owns many Z.Vex pedals
 Kevin Shields of My Bloody Valentine owns numerous Z.Vex pedals
 Efrim Menuck of A Silver Mt. Zion
 Anton Newcombe of Brian Jonestown Massacre uses Super Duper and Mastoron
 Ben Gibbard of Death Cab for Cutie uses a Box of Rock and Super Duper 2 in 1
 Annie Clark of St. Vincent uses a Z.Vex Mastotron
 Michio Kurihara of Ghost
 Mike Kerr of Royal Blood uses a Z.Vex Mastotron

Other products
The company also manufactures a Probe line of effects (the Fuzz Probe, Wah Probe and Tremolo Probe) that are modified versions of other pedals the company makes. What makes this series of pedals unique is the copper plate, which has an antenna underneath it that senses how close your foot (or something else) is to the pedal, giving you the ability to manipulate an aspect of the pedal's sound. From the company's website:

"The probe circuit generates a small (one or two inches high) 'bubble' of RF energy at about a million cycles per second above the copper plate. As your foot or hand (or any wet or metallic object, for that matter) approaches the copper plate, the RF field is disturbed and the circuit reacts by increasing the brightness of an LED, which drives a photoresistive cell and controls the circuit."

References

External links
Z.Vex homepage

Guitar effects manufacturing companies
Manufacturing companies based in Minneapolis